Before Nightfall is the second studio album by American singer-songwriter Robert Francis, released on October 9, 2009, by Atlantic Records. It was released in 2009 with "Junebug" as lead single, followed by "Keep On Running". Both were also released as video clips. Before Nightfall is Francis' first album on a major label. In an interview with Redefine magazine, Francis said that darkness was a major theme on the album.

Critical reception
Andrew Leahey of AllMusic summarized it as a "grounded, no-frills album, sometimes sweeping in scope." The A.V. Club Marc Hawthorne found producer Sardy's presence intruding, writing, "he and [Sardy] have given his music a sheen that adds too much distance between performer and listener." Michael Hann at The Guardian felt the album's contents artificial, commenting, "It's a pleasant haze of guitars, bass and drums, sliding by like midwestern plains viewed from a car window [...] but there's little of the sense of sincere connection that lifts the very best American heartland rock out of its homeland and makes it universal."

Track listing

References

2009 albums
Albums produced by Dave Sardy